E. S. Kennedy can refer to :
 Edward Shirley Kennedy, alpinist and writer
 Edward Stewart Kennedy, historian of science